Eduard C. F. Dämel also Damel, Daemel (1821–3 September 1900) was a German entomologist. Dämel was an insect dealer in Hamburg.

He spent the years 1867–1874 in Queensland, Australia, where he collected insects and other natural history material (including botanical specimens for his dealership and for the Museum Godeffroy). Dämel was the agent for Jacob Boll, a Swiss born entomologist who lived in Texas. Boll supplied insects from the southwestern United States
and northwestern Mexico.

Dämel and another Hamburg entomologist working in Australia, Amalie Dietrich, collected the butterflies described by Georg Semper in 1879 in "Beitrag zur Rhopalocerenfauna von Australien ". (J. Mus. Godeffroy 14: 138–194 + Plates 8, 9).

Legacy
Dämel is commemorated in the scientific name of a species of Australian venomous snake, Hemiaspis damelii.

Source
 Weidner, H. (1967). "Geschichte der Entomologie in Hamburg ". Abh. Verh. Naturwiss. Ver. Hamburg, N. F. 9 (Supplement): 5–387.

References

German entomologists
1821 births
1900 deaths
Place of birth missing
Scientists from Hamburg
People from Queensland